An Dealg Óir (meaning 'The Golden Thorn') is the fifth studio album from Irish singer Pádraigín Ní Uallacháin. The album was released on the Gael Linn label. The album is made up of songs from the Oriel area in southeast Ulster in Ireland. Éalaigh Liom / Elope With Me became one of Ní Uallacháin's most popular tracks since its broadcast on the BBC's Highland Sessions.

Track listing
"Éalaigh Liom"
"Éirigh Suas, A Stóirín"
"An Seanduine Dóite"
"Is Fada an Lá"
"Ailí Gheal Chiúin"
"Amhrán na Craoibhe"
"Marbhna Airt Óig Uí Néill"
"Thugamar Féin an Samhradh Linn"
"Uilleagán Dubh Ó"
"Cailín as Contae Lú"
"Séamus Mac Murfaidh"
"Máire Bhán"
"An Bonnán Buí"
"Tá 'na Lá"

Personnel 
Pádraigín Ní Uallacháin – vocals
Steve Cooney - guitars
Liam O'Flynn – uilleann pipes
Laoise Kelly – Irish harp
Liam Ó Maonlaí – whistles
Ódhrán Ó Casaide - uilleann pipes, whistles
Helen Davies – harp
Máire Breatnach – fiddle, viola
Rónán Ó Snodaigh – percussion
Pat Crowley – piano, keyboards

References

External links
 An Dealg Óir - official website

2002 albums
Pádraigín Ní Uallacháin albums